David Christie (1 January 1948 – 11 May 1997) was a French singer. Born Jacques Pepino in Tarare, he also used the pseudonyms James Bolden and Napoleon Jones. He is best known for the hits "Saddle Up" (1982) and "I Love to Love (But My Baby Just Loves to Dance)", which are included on various 1980s compilation albums.

As a composer working with lyricist Jack Robinson, Christie, using the name James Bolden, wrote songs that have sold more than 50 million records around the world. Their hits include: "I Love to Love (But My Baby Loves to Dance)", "Love Me Like a Lover" and "Rendezvous" (Tina Charles); "Saddle Up" (David Christie); "Strut Your Funky Stuff" (Frantique); "(If You Want It) Do It Yourself" (Gloria Gaynor); and "Do or Die" (Grace Jones).

In 1973, Christie had his first child, Nathalie, with Françoise Richard. He later had a second daughter, Julia, born of his relationship with the singer Nina Morato. Christie committed suicide in 1997 in Capbreton, following the accidental death of his 11-year-old daughter Julia.

Discography

Albums
1974: Never Alone
1975: Napoleon Jones featuring David Christie
1977: Love is the Most Important Thing
1978: Back Fire
1980: Flashback
1982: Back in Control
1984: Stress

Singles

"Israel"
"Julie
"Our First Child"
"For a Little Heart"
"You are the God Child"
"Always the Same Rumba"
"Lazy Love"
"Falling in Love in Summertime"
"Love is the Most Important Thing"
"Paris by Night"
"Do Not Stop Me, I Like It"
"Saddle Up" (1982)
"Rally Down to Sally's"
"Our Time Has Come"
"Stress"
"Cindy Lou"
"Living It Up"
"Chain of Love"
"Holidays Capbreton"
"Saddle Up 1990"
"Saddle Up 1993"

References

1948 births
People from Tarare
20th-century French male singers
1997 suicides
Suicides in France